Connor Smith (born 1 February 2002) is a Scottish professional footballer who plays for Hamilton Academical, on loan from Heart of Midlothian, as a midfielder.

Club career
He made his senior debut for Heart of Midlothian on 13 May 2018, in a 1–0 league defeat away at Kilmarnock. He was one of four Hearts youth players to make their debuts in that match, alongside Chris Hamilton, Cammy Logan, and Leeroy Makovora. Smith was subsequently loaned to Cowdenbeath, Arbroath, Cove Rangers and Queen's Park.

He moved on loan to Hamilton Academical in January 2023.

International career
Smith has represented Scotland at under-16, under-17, under-18 and under-21 youth levels.

Personal life
Smith attended the SFA performance school at Broughton High School. His older brother, Callum, is also a footballer.

Career statistics

References

2002 births
Living people
Scottish footballers
Heart of Midlothian F.C. players
Cowdenbeath F.C. players
Arbroath F.C. players
Cove Rangers F.C. players
Queen's Park F.C. players
Hamilton Academical F.C. players
Lowland Football League players
Scottish Professional Football League players
Association football midfielders
Scotland youth international footballers
Scotland under-21 international footballers